KWOW (104.1 MHz) is a commercial FM radio station broadcasting a Regional Mexican radio format. Licensed to Clifton, Texas, United States, the station serves the Waco metropolitan area and is known as "La Ley 104.1" (The Law).  The station is currently owned by Waco Entertainment Group, LLC.    Its studios are located in Waco, and its transmitter is located northeast of Valley Mills, Texas.

References

External links

WOW
Regional Mexican radio stations in the United States